Zanagee Artis (born 1999) is an American climate activist. He is best known for co-founding the youth-led climate activist group Zero Hour in 2017. As of 2021, Artis was Acting Policy Director of Zero Hour.

Biography 
In high school, he started his high school's Sustainability Committee, which evolved into its Green Team. In the summer between his high school junior and senior years in 2017, he attended a summer program at Princeton University. Artis states he began to start thinking beyond his local community after talking with fellow program participants Jamie Margolin and Madelaine Tew. They and other youth activists formed Zero Hour. Zero Hour names colonialism, capitalism, racism, and patriarchy as the core causes of the climate crisis.

Zero Hour organized the a Youth Climate March in July 2018 in Washington, D.C., with satellite marches held worldwide. Artis, as logistics director, planned the main event and coordinated with the United States Capitol Police. Artis states, "That was a real launching point for our movement, and it also inspired young people around the world. Greta Thunberg's Fridays for Future was actually inspired by the Youth Climate March."

Subsequently, Artis worked with the Sunrise Movement on the September and November 2019 climate strikes. In September 2020, he stated that Zero Hour has shifted its focus to education. During the 2020 United States presidential election, as policy director, Artis led the #Vote4OurFuture campaign. The campaign focused on swing states like Michigan and Pennsylvania, with the goal of increasing voter turnout in support of the Green New Deal. Artis stated, "We want climate change to be a top priority on people’s minds when they’re going to the polls in November because of the way it will impact people of color and people living in those cities."

Personal 
Artis grew up in Clinton, Connecticut and credits his childhood spent in Hammonasset Beach State Park with inspiring his interest in environmentalism. Artis entered Brown University in 2018, with the intention of attending law school. He is a member of the fraternity Zeta Delta Xi.

References 

Living people
People from Clinton, Connecticut
21st-century American people
Activists from Connecticut
Climate activists
Youth climate activists
1999 births